= Parliament of Flanders =

Parliament of Flanders may refer to:

- The present-day Flemish Parliament (Flanders being northern Belgium)
- Parlement de Flandres, a parlement in the French Ancien Régime
